Der tote Preuße ("the dead Prussian") is an unfinished novel by the German writer Ernst von Salomon, published posthumously in 1973. It has the subtitle Roman einer Staatsidee ("novel of a state idea"). The novel was supposed to be in three volumes and explain the concept of Prussia through an epic narrative. Salomon described the project as his "chief work"; however, he only wrote the first volume, which does not go beyond medieval times, and it was published in its unedited manuscript form. The book has a preface by Hans Lipinsky-Gottersdorf.

Reception
Der Spiegel described the published material as the "ruins" of the conceived novel, and the content as a "history primer, in which lexicon, historical booklet and rough woodcut verdicts à la Werner Beumelburg amalgamate with double entendres ... and traces of old narrative art".

References

1973 German novels
German historical novels
German-language novels
Novels by Ernst von Salomon
Novels published posthumously
Prussia
Unfinished novels